The Chandler Formation is a Mesozoic geologic formation in Canada. Dinosaur remains are among the fossils that have been recovered from the formation, although none have yet been referred to a specific genus.

Vertebrate fauna

Crinoidea

Bony Fish

Synapsids

Dinosaurs

See also

List of volcanoes in Canada
Volcanism of Canada
Volcanism of Northern Canada
Geography of Nunavut
 List of dinosaur-bearing rock formations
 List of stratigraphic units with indeterminate dinosaur fossils

Footnotes

References
 Weishampel, David B.; Dodson, Peter; and Osmólska, Halszka (eds.): The Dinosauria, 2nd, Berkeley: University of California Press. 861 pp. .

Hettangian Stage
Large igneous provinces
Volcanism of Nunavut
Geography of Qikiqtaaluk Region
Geography of Baffin Island